George Chetwynd (1783-1850), of Brocton Hall, near Stafford and Grendon Hall (demolished, 1933), near Atherstone, Warwickshire, was an English politician.

He was born the eldest son of Sir George Chetwynd, 1st Baronet of Brocton, Staffordshire and educated at Harrow School (1798-1802) and Brasenose College, Oxford (1802). He entered Lincoln's Inn in  1808 to study law and was called to the bar in 1813. He succeeded his father in 1824.

He was commissioned as Lieutenant-Colonel Commandant of the Central Regiment, Staffordshire Local Militia, on 9 April 1810. He was a Member of Parliament (MP) for Stafford from 1820 to 1826 and was appointed Sheriff of Warwickshire for 1828–29.

He died in 1850. He had married Hannah Maria, the daughter and coheiress of John Sparrow of Bishton Hall, Staffordshire and had 2 sons and 3 daughters. He was succeeded by Sir George Chetwynd, 3rd Baronet. His younger son William Henry Chetwynd was involved in a sensational divorce case in 1865.

References

1783 births
1850 deaths
People educated at Harrow School
Alumni of Brasenose College, Oxford
Members of Lincoln's Inn
People from the Borough of Stafford
People from Warwickshire
Baronets in the Baronetage of Great Britain
Members of the Parliament of the United Kingdom for Stafford
UK MPs 1820–1826
High Sheriffs of Warwickshire
Staffordshire Militia officers